Geoffrey Lawrence Betham (8 April 1889 – 6 November 1962)  was an English first-class cricketer and British Indian Army officer.

References

External links

1889 births
1963 deaths
People from Belgaum
People educated at Dulwich College
British Indian Army officers
Indian Army personnel of World War I
English cricketers
Europeans cricketers
Europeans and Parsees cricketers
Recipients of the Military Cross
Free Foresters cricketers
Indian Army cricketers
Companions of the Order of the Indian Empire
Rajasthan cricketers
Knights Commander of the Order of the British Empire